Woolland is a village and civil parish in north Dorset, England, situated in the Blackmore Vale under Bulbarrow Hill  west of Blandford Forum. In 2013 the estimated population of the civil parish was 50.  The village had a population of 76 in 2001.

The village is first mentioned in Cartularium Saxonicum from the year 939 Wonlond, the Domesday Book from the year 1086 Winlande and the Pipe Rolls from the year 1170 Wunlanda.  The name is interpreted as Old English wynn-land meadow land or pasture land.

The sculptor Elisabeth Frink had a studio in the village during the 1970s.

References

External links

Frink statue of Christian Martyrs

Villages in Dorset